Roustan is a French surname. It may refer to:

 Antoine-Jacques Roustan (1734-1808), Genevan pastor and theologian
 Didier Roustan (born 1957), French sports journalist
 Marius Roustan (1870-1942), French politician
 Max Roustan (born 1944), French politician, National Assembly member for Gard
 Paul Roustan (born 1979), French body painter and photographer
 Théodore Roustan (1833-1906), French diplomat

See also
 Roustam Raza, also known as Roustan